|- style="background-color: #A0B0FF;" colspan="3"
|  Planet
|- bgcolor="#FFFAFA" 
| Gliese 849b || data

Gliese 849, or GJ 849, is a small, solitary star in the equatorial constellation of Aquarius. It has a reddish hue and is invisible to the naked eye with an apparent visual magnitude of 10.41. The distance to this star is 28.7 light years based on parallax, but it is drifting closer to the Sun with a radial velocity of −15.3 km/s. It has a pair of confirmed gas giant companions.

The stellar classification of GJ 849 is M3.5V, which means this is a small red dwarf star generating energy through hydrogen fusion at its core region. Various studies have found super-solar abundances in the spectra, indicating that the elemental abundances of higher mass elements is significantly higher than in the Sun. The star has about half the mass and size of the Sun, and is spinning slowly with a rotation period of approximately 39 days. The estimated age of the star is more than three billion years. It is radiating a mere 2.9% of the luminosity of the Sun from its photosphere at an effective temperature of 3,490 K.

Planetary system
In late 2006, a long-period Jupiter-like exoplanet was reported to be orbiting the red dwarf in a period just over 5 years in length. There was also a linear trend in the radial velocities which suggested another longer period companion. The trend in the radial velocities was confirmed in 2013. An orbit for the second exoplanet was finally determined in 2015. It is the first planet discovered orbiting a red dwarf with a semi-major axis greater than 0.21 AU.

See also
 List of star systems within 25–30 light-years
 Gliese 317
 Gliese 649
 Gliese 581
 List of extrasolar planets

References

External links
 
 
 



M-type main-sequence stars
Planetary systems with two confirmed planets
Aquarius (constellation)
BD-05 5715
0849
109388
J22094029-0438267